Ebrahim Yazdi (26 September 1931 – 27 August 2017) was an Iranian Islamist politician, pharmacist, and diplomat who served as deputy prime minister and minister of foreign affairs in the Islamic revolutionary interim government of Mehdi Bazargan, until his resignation in November 1979, in protest at the Iran hostage crisis. From 1995 until 2017, he headed the Freedom Movement of Iran. Yazdi was also a trained cancer researcher.

Early life and education
Yazdi was born in Qazvin on 26 September 1931. He studied pharmacy at the University of Tehran. Then he received a master's degree in philosophy again from the University of Tehran.

After the military coup of 1953, which deposed the government of Mohammad Mossadegh, Yazdi joined the underground National Resistance Movement of Iran, and was active in this organization from 1953 to 1960. This organization opposed to the Shah, Mohammad Reza Pahlavi. Yazdi traveled to the United States in 1961 to continue his education and in the US, continued his involvement in political activities against the Shah.

He was co-founder of the Freedom Movement of Iran, Abroad, along with Mostafa Chamran, Ali Shariati, and Sadegh Qotbzadeh in 1961. They were all part of the radical external wing of the group. In 1963, Yazdi, Chamran and Ghotbzadeh went to Egypt and met the authorities to establish an anti-Shah organization in the country, which was later called SAMA, special organization for unity and action. Chamran was chosen as its military head before returning to the US. In 1966, Yazdi moved headquarters of SAMA to Beirut. In 1967, he enrolled at Baylor College of Medicine in Houston (which before 1969 was part of the Baylor University system) and received a PhD in biochemistry.

In 1975, Yazdi was tried in absentia in an Iranian military court and condemned to ten years imprisonment, with orders issued for his arrest upon return to Iran. Because of his activities, he was unable to return to Iran and remained in the United States until July 1977. He became a naturalized US citizen in Houston in 1971. When Ayatollah Khomenei moved to Neauphle-le-Château, a Parisian suburb, from Iraq in 1978, Yazdi also went to Neauphle-le-Château and began to serve as an advisor to the Ayatollah. He was also his spokesperson in Paris.

Career and political activities
Yazdi worked as a research assistant of pathology and research instructor of pharmacology at Baylor College of Medicine in Houston until 1977. He also worked at the Veterans Administration Hospital in Houston. From 1961 to 1977, Yazdi founded the Muslim Students Association from the United States and later became a spokesman for Paris-based Ayatollah Ruhollah Khomeini.

In 1978, he joined Ayatollah Khomeini in Paris where the latter had been in exile and became one of his advisors. He translated the reports of Khomeini into English in a press conference on 3 February 1979 in Tehran. He was the deputy prime minister and minister of foreign affairs in the interim government of Mehdi Bazargan, until 6 November 1979. Yazdi proposed to celebrate 'Jerusalem Day' and his suggestion was endorsed by Khomeini in August 1979. Yazdi's American citizenship was revoked in 1979. In May 1980, he was appointed by Khomenei as head of the Kayhan newspaper. 

The day after the victory of the revolution, on 2 February 1979, several foreign embassies in Tehran, including those of the United States, the United Kingdom, and Yugoslavia were over-run by groups identifying themselves as leftist revolutionaries. The opinion of the Revolutionary Council, of which Yazdi was a member, was that these attacks may be aimed at creating chaos and preventing the international recognition of the new regime. In the case of the US embassy, the attackers were successful in entering the embassy compound and taking personnel, including the US ambassador, William Sullivan, captive. Yazdi, at the request of Ayatollah Khomeini and the Revolutionary Council, went to the embassies and resolved the crisis, resulting in the release of embassy personnel and the departure of the attackers. 
 
On 4 November 1979, the US embassy was taken over for a second time, this time by a group calling itself “Students Following the Line of the Imam (i.e. Ayatollah Khomeini)” and led by Mohammad Mousavi Khoeiniha, who had closer ties to certain revolutionary leaders. 

As before, Yazdi was asked to go to the embassy and resolve the crisis.  He asked and received permission of Khomeini to expel the occupiers, but shortly thereafter found out Khomeini had changed his mind and appeared on state television openly endorsed the takeover of the embassy. The entire cabinet of the interim government, including Yazdi and Prime Minister Mehdi Bazargan, resigned in protest the next day.  They stated that they opposed the embassy takeover as “contrary to the national interest of Iran”.

The embassy takeover is considered to have been motivated in part by an internal struggle between various factions within the revolutionary leadership, with Yazdi and Bazargan on one side, and more radical clergy on the other. The embassy attackers, in subsequent statements indicated that one of their primary objectives in the takeover of the US embassy in November 1979 was to force the resignation of Yazdi, Bazargan, and the entire cabinet.

Among the areas of conflict between the two factions was the behavior of the Revolutionary Courts and the Revolutionary Committees. Yazdi was present in the Revolutionary Court in the Alavi School in Tehran and acted as interrogator, prosecutor, and defense lawyer at the same time in cooperation with the judge Ayatollah Sadegh Khalkhaali. In contrast to Yazdi, Bazargan supported a general amnesty for all members of the Shah's regime, provided that they cease to act against the revolution. He publicly opposed the secret trials and the summary executions carried out by the Revolutionary Courts, led by Ayatollah Sadegh Khalkhaali. Bazargan and other members of the interim government may have called for fair and open trials for those in charge of political posts under the Shah. The radical clerics, on the other hand, stated that the rapid trials and executions were essential to protect the revolution.  "He was the voice of the Iranian revolution and that voice was talking about freedom, democracy and women’s rights. This was something he truly believed in and he was proven to be wrong because that’s not what the revolution turned out to be. It became a killing machine after the takeover. He protested vigorously against the judicial killings of people who had been close to Shah and that got him into trouble with people around Khomeini."

After resignation from office, Yazdi and other members of the Freedom Movement of Iran ran in elections for the first post-revolutionary Islamic Consultative Assembly or parliament. Yazdi, Bazargan, and four other members of the Freedom Movement, namely Mostafa Chamran, Ahmad Sadr, Hashem Sabbaghian, and Yadollah Sahabi, were elected. They served at the parliament from 1980 to 1984.

After the Iraqi invasion of Iran in September 1980, Yazdi fully supported the Iranian war effort against the invasion, but opposed the continuation of the war after the Iranian victory in Khorramshahr in 1982. The war continued for an additional six years. During these six years, Yazdi and others in the Freedom Movement issued several open letters to Ayatollah Khomeini opposing the continuation of the war. These letters and other public statements resulted in the firebombing of Yazdi's residence in Tehran in 1985, and the arrest and imprisonment of several members of the Freedom Movement.

In subsequent elections in Iran for president, parliament, and city councils, Yazdi and other members of the Freedom Movement filed for candidacy but were barred from running by the Guardian Council, because of their opposition to policies and actions of the government.

In December 1997, Yazdi was arrested on unknown charges and detained in Evin prison in Tehran. Even after his release, he was barred from leaving the country for many years, and summoned on a regular basis to answer questions before the revolutionary council, with his lawyer, Nobel Prize–winning Shirin Ebadi. As of 2008 Yazdi is still accused of “attempting to convert the rule of velaii (jurisprudence) into democratic rule.”

After the death of Bazargan in January 1995, Yazdi was elected as leader of Freedom Movement of Iran. Under pressure from the revolutionary court prosecutor, Yazdi offered his resignation as FMI Leader from on 20 March 2011 to the leadership council of the FMI.  They have yet to accept his resignation and Yazdi continued to function as the leader of the Freedom Movement of Iran.

Electoral history

Later years and death

Yazdi was arrested in December 1997 for "desecrating religious sanctities" and freed on 26 December on bail. On 17 June 2009, during the 2009 Iranian election protests, it was reported that Yazdi was arrested while undergoing tests at the Tehran hospital according to the Freedom Movement of Iran website. On 22 June, he was released back to the hospital for a medical procedure. On 28 December 2009, Yazdi was arrested again in the wake of renewed protests, according to the Jaras reformist website.

Yazdi and several others were arrested on 1 October 2010 in Isfahan for participating in an "illegal Friday prayer." All others were freed within days. Ebrahim Yazdi remained in "temporary custody"—first in Evin prison and then in a "secure" facility under the control of Iran's security forces until March 2011. He was released in April 2011.
 
On 27 August 2017, Yazdi died of pancreatic cancer, at the age of 85 in Izmir, Turkey, where he was under treatment. His body transferred to Iran and was buried in Behesht-e Zahra.

Selected works
Aakhareen Talaash-ha Dar Aakhareen Rooz-ha (Final Efforts, Final Days), Qalam Publications, 1984 (13th Edition, 1999) (a report and analysis on the Iranian Islamic Revolution of 1979)
Principles of Molecular Genetics (Third Edition), Ettela’aat Publications, Tehran, 2000
Mutational Changes in Generic Materials, Matin Cultural Foundation, Tehran, 1986
Seh Jumhuri (The Three Republics), Jaameye Iranian Publications, 2000 (a compilation of political essays and articles by Ebrahim Yazdi published in Iranian journals from 1997–2000)
Khatti Dar Darya (A Line in the Sea), Qalam Publications, Tehran, 2000 (a new interpretation of the verse of the Quran on “Marajul Bahrain”)
Khaak-haa-ye Rosi va Paydaayesh-e Hayaat (Clay Minerals and the Origin of Life), Qalam Publications, 2001 (a new interpretation of the verses of the Quran on “Teen-e Laatheb”)
Kalbod Shekaafee-ye Towte-e: Barresee-ye Kudetaa-ye Beestohasht-e Mordaad 1332 (The Anatomy of a Plot: An Analysis of the Coup of August 1953), Qalam Publications, 2002 (a collection of essays on the US and British led military coup against the national government of Mohammad Mossadegh)
Docterin-e Amniyyat-e Melli (National Security Doctrine), Sarai Publications, Tehran, 2004 (a compilation of political essays on Iranian foreign affairs from 1980–2004)
Jonbesh-e Daaneshju-yi-e Iran 1320–1340 (The Iranian Student Movement from 1941–1961), Qalam Publications, 2004 (a history and memoirs of the student movement and activities of Ebrahim Yazdi during this period)

References

Other sources

 J D Stempel, Inside the Iranian Revolution, Indiana Univ Press, 1981
 Sadegh Khalkhali, Khateraateh Khalkhaali (Memoirs of Khalkhaali), Sayeh Publications, Tehran, 2003
 Abdolali Bazargan, ed, Moshketaal va Masa’ele Av’valeen Saale Enghelaab Az Zabaane Mohandes Bazargaan (Issues of the First Year of the Revolutions as Explained by Mehdi Bazargan), Tehran, 1981

1931 births
2017 deaths
People from Qazvin
University of Tehran alumni
Baylor University alumni
People of the Iranian Revolution
Deputies of Tehran, Rey, Shemiranat and Eslamshahr
Foreign ministers of Iran
Prisoners and detainees of Iran
Iranian revolutionaries
Iranian expatriates in the United States
Members of the 1st Islamic Consultative Assembly
Iranian expatriates in France
People with acquired American citizenship
Council of the Islamic Revolution members
Representatives of the Supreme Leader in the Keyhan Institute
National Front (Iran) student activists
Deaths from cancer in Turkey
Deaths from pancreatic cancer
Movement of God-Worshipping Socialists politicians
Members of the Association for Defense of Freedom and the Sovereignty of the Iranian Nation
Members of the National Council for Peace
Secretaries-general of the Freedom Movement of Iran
Former United States citizens
Freedom Movement of Iran MPs
Heads of political office of the Freedom Movement of Iran